Okaloosa County is located in the northwestern portion of the U.S. state of Florida, extending from the Gulf of Mexico to the Alabama state line. As of the 2020 census, the population was 211,668. Its county seat is Crestview. Okaloosa County is included in the Crestview-Fort Walton Beach-Destin, FL Metropolitan Statistical Area.

History
Okaloosa County was created by an act passed on September 7, 1915, formed from the eastern ranges of Santa Rosa County and the western ranges of Walton County.

Okaloosa is a Choctaw word meaning "black water"; oka means "water" and lusa means "black" in the Choctaw language.

Geography
Fort Walton Beach and three United States Air Force bases, (Duke Field in the North and Eglin AFB and Hurlburt Field are in the south).

Adjacent counties
 Covington County, Alabama - north
 Walton County, Florida - east
 Santa Rosa County, Florida - west
 Escambia County, Alabama - northwest

National protected areas
 Choctawhatchee National Forest (part)
 Gulf Islands National Seashore (part)

State Parks and Forests 
 Blackwater River State Forest:  spanning Okaloosa and neighboring Santa Rosa County.
 Fred Gannon Rocky Bayou State Recreation Area:  of sand pine forest along Choctawhatchee Bay. The park provides facilities for camping, hiking, fishing, and canoeing.
 Henderson Beach State Park:  of sugar sand beach along the Gulf of Mexico. The park provides facilities for camping, RV-ing, and picnicking, as well as a pavilion and boardwalk. It is located just east of downtown Destin on U.S. 98.

Demographics

As of the 2020 United States census, there were 211,668 people, 79,235 households, and 51,719 families residing in the county.

As of 2015, there were 198,664 people and 95,494 households. As of the census of 2010,the population density was 194.4 people per square mile (70/km2).

 White alone=81.5% (July 1, 2015)
 Black or African American alone=10.2% (July 1, 2015)
 American Native and Alaskan Native alone=0.7% (July 1, 2015)
 Asian alone=3.2% (July 1, 2015)
 Native Hawaiian and Other Pacific Islander alone=0.3% (July 1, 2015)
 Two or more races=4.1% (July 1, 2015)
 Hispanic or Latino=8.6% (July 1, 2015)

As of 2015, there were 95,494 households. Within the 2010 census, 33.10% had children under the age of 18 living with them, 56.20% were married couples living together, 10.20% had a female householder with no husband present, and 29.80% were non-families. 23.50% of all households were made up of individuals, and 7.50% had someone living alone who was 65 years of age or older.  The average household size was 2.49 and the average family size was 2.94.

According to the 2010 census, the population was spread out, with 24.70% under the age of 18, 9.60% from 18 to 24, 31.10% from 25 to 44, 22.40% from 45 to 64, and 12.10% who were 65 years of age or older.  The median age was 36 years. For every 100 females there were 102.20 males.  For every 100 females age 18 and over, there were 101.50 males.

In 2015, the median income for a household in the county was $55,880.  The per capita income for the county was $28,902.  11.3% of the population were below the poverty line.

Education
The county's public schools come under the Okaloosa County School District.

Northwest Florida State College serves over 10,000 residents of Okaloosa County annually for bachelor's degrees, associate degrees, and certificates. The college maintains four campuses in Okaloosa County: Niceville, Crestview, Ft. Walton Beach, and Hurlburt Field, and one campus in Walton County, FL.

Libraries
Okaloosa County is served by the Okaloosa County Public Library Cooperative. Formed in October 1997, the Cooperative originally included the county and the cities of Crestview, Mary Esther, and Niceville. The cities of Fort Walton Beach, Valparaiso, and Destin all joined the Cooperative by the year 2000. The Okaloosa County Public Library Cooperative is governed by an independent inter-governmental agency with seven members.

Transportation

Airports
 Bob Sikes Airport
 Destin–Fort Walton Beach

Highways

  Interstate 10
  US Highway 90
  US Highway 98
  Florida State Road 4
  Florida State Road 85
  Florida State Road 188
  Florida State Road 189
  Florida State Road 293
  Florida State Road 393
  Florida State Road 397

Surface transportation
Emerald Coast Rider (formerly Okaloosa County Transit) operates bus services in the county.

Politics
Okaloosa County is one of the most conservative counties in Florida. Incumbent George W. Bush won the county in 2004 with 78% of the popular vote and in 2008 the Republican candidate John McCain polled 72%. Mitt Romney won the county in 2012 with 73.86% (69,785) of the popular vote, while Donald Trump won 70.42% (71,893) in 2016.

Communities

Cities
 Crestview
 Destin
 Fort Walton Beach
 Laurel Hill
 Mary Esther
 Niceville
 Valparaiso

Towns
 Cinco Bayou
 Shalimar

Census-designated places
 Eglin AFB
 Hurlburt Field
 Lake Lorraine
 Ocean City
 Wright

Other unincorporated communities

 Baker
 Blackman
 Bluewater Bay
 Campton
 Deerland
 Dorcas
 Escambia Farms
 Florosa
 Garden City
 Holt
 Milligan
 Okaloosa Island
 Seminole
 Svea
 Timpoochee
 Villa Tasso
 WynneHaven Beach

See also
 National Register of Historic Places listings in Okaloosa County, Florida

Notes

References

External links

Okaloosa County website

 
Florida counties
1915 establishments in Florida
Florida placenames of Native American origin
Populated places established in 1915
North Florida
List of place names of Choctaw origin in the United States